The Netherlands selected their Junior Eurovision Song Contest entry for 2008 through Junior Songfestival 2008, a national final consisting of 10 songs spread out into two semi-finals and a final. The final winner was Marissa with the song "1 Dag".

Before Junior Eurovision

Junior Songfestival 2008 
AVRO held a national final to select the Dutch entry for the contest. The contest consisted of two semi-finals and one final. Each semi-final had 5 songs, with 2 advancing to the final: one more entry was then granted access to the final as a wildcard entry, allowing 5 songs to compete in the final.

The three voting groups were awarded as follows to the competing entries:
Kids jury - A jury of children aged under 16 years
Jury - A jury of adults aged 16 or over
Televoting

Competing entries
Over 1000 songs were submitted to AVRO for the competition. 73 of the artists submitted were asked to attend live auditions, which took place on 28 and 29 April 2008 in Rhenen. 17 entries were selected to go through to the next stage, where a further seven entries were rejected, leaving the final 10 entries that competed in the live shows.

Semi-final 1

Semi-final 2

Final

Marissa's accident 
Marissa was later involved in a car accident on 4 November 2008, just over two weeks away from the Contest in Limassol, when she and her sister collided with a car on a scooter. Marissa's leg was placed in plaster after being sprained, however this did not deter her from competing in the contest, with Marissa stating that she would try as much as she can to get to Junior Eurovision, even if she was in a wheelchair. Fortunately it did not come to this, and Marissa was able to perform as normal.

At Eurovision 
Marissa performed 11th at the Junior Eurovision Song Contest 2008, performing after Malta and before Ukraine. Marissa received 27 points and finished 13th.

Voting

Notes

References

External links 
  AVRO website

Netherlands
Junior Eurovision Song Contest
2008